Scott Barry Kaufman is an American cognitive scientist, author, podcaster, and popular science writer. His writing and research focuses on intelligence, creativity, and human potential. Most media attention has focused on Kaufman's attempt to redefine intelligence. Kaufman is founder and director of the Center for Human Potential and has taught courses at Columbia, NYU, the University of Pennsylvania, and elsewhere. He is one of the top 20 most cited scientists studying intelligence. 

Kaufman has also written a number of books and is host of The Psychology Podcast. In 2015, he was named one of "50 groundbreaking scientists who are changing the way we see the world" by Business Insider, and in 2021 Louis Vuitton selected him as one of 200 "visionaries" to celebrate Vuitton's 200th birthday. As a result, his "Manifesto for a Human-Centered Education" appeared in "200 Trunks, 200 Visionaries: The Exhibition" around the world. In 2022, he taught a class on gratitude with Oprah.

Education 

Kaufman received his B.S. from Carnegie Mellon University, where he double majored in psychology and human-computer interaction, and where he was Herbert A. Simon's last research assistant and a student of Randy Pausch. In 2005, he received his M.Phil. from King's College, Cambridge under a Gates Scholarship, where he worked with Nicholas Mackintosh. After Cambridge, Kaufman earned his Ph.D. in Cognitive Psychology from Yale University where he was mentored by Robert Sternberg, Jeremy R. Gray, and Jerome L. Singer. From 2009-2010, he was a post-doctoral fellow at the Center Leo Apostel for Interdisciplinary Studies.

Research

The dual-process theory of human intelligence 

Most theories of human intelligence and tests of intelligence emphasize controlled and deliberate reasoning as the hallmark of human intelligence. While agreeing that such thought processes are an important component of intelligence, Kaufman argues that spontaneous forms of thinking such as insight, imaginative play, daydreaming, implicit learning, and a reduced latent inhibition are also important contributors to a wide range of intelligent behaviors as well as creativity. Integrating modern dual-process theories of cognition with research on human intelligence, Kaufman proposed the dual-process theory of human intelligence. 

The theory emphasizes the importance of adaptation to task demands as the essence of intelligent functioning. At the same time, the theory takes into account an individual's personal goals and accommodates a wide range of intelligent behaviors in a wide range of fields, from the arts to the sciences. A key assumption of the theory is that abilities are not static entities but are constantly changing throughout the life span as the person continually engages with controlled and spontaneous modes of thought. In Ungifted: Intelligence Redefined, Kaufman expanded his dual-process theory to make the point that his theory is also fundamentally developmental, because it views intelligence as the dynamic interplay of engagement and ability over time in the pursuit of personal goals.

Light triad
Influenced by the dark triad theory of antisocial personalities, Kaufman is researching a proposed "light triad" of personality virtues: humanism, Kantianism, and faith in humanity.

Tragic optimism 
The concept of "tragic optimism" in the phrase coined by the existential-humanistic psychologist and Holocaust survivor Viktor Frankl, has been suggested by Kaufman as a healthy antidote to toxic positivity.

Bibliography

Books 

Choose Growth: A Workbook for Transcending Trauma, Fear, and Self-Doubt (2022) New York, NY: TarcherPerigee. (ISBN 0-593-53863-3)
Transcend: The New Science of Self-Actualization (2020) New York, NY: TarcherPerigee.
Twice Exceptional: Supporting and Educating Bright and Creative Students with Learning Difficulties (2018) New York, NY: Oxford University Press.
Wired to Create: Unraveling the Mysteries of the Creative Mind (with Carolyn Gregoire) (2015) New York, NY: TarcherPerigee.
 The Philosophy of Creativity (with Elliot Samuel Paul) (2014). New York, NY: Oxford University Press.
 The Complexity of Greatness: Beyond Talent or Practice (2013) New York, NY: Oxford University Press.
 Ungifted: Intelligence Redefined (2013). New York, NY: Basic Books.
 Mating Intelligence Unleashed: The Role of the Mind in Sex, Dating, and Love (with Glenn Geher) (2013). New York, NY: Oxford University Press.
 The Cambridge Handbook of Intelligence (with Robert J. Sternberg) (2011). New York, NY: Cambridge University Press.
 The Psychology of Creative Writing (with James C. Kaufman) (2009). Cambridge, UK: Cambridge University Press.

References

External links 
 Personal website

Living people
1979 births
Sternberg, Robert J.
American educational psychologists
Evolutionary psychologists
Intelligence researchers
American cognitive scientists
Positive psychologists
New York University faculty
Carnegie Mellon University alumni
Alumni of King's College, Cambridge
Yale University alumni
Writers from Philadelphia
Lower Merion High School alumni
Humanistic psychologists